NHV is three-letter abbreviation which may represent any of the following:

 National Herbarium of Victoria in Australia
 Netherlands Handball Association, the national Handball association in Netherlands.
 New Haven Union Station in New Haven, Connecticut (Amtrak code)
 Nuku Hiva Airport on Nuku Hiva in French Polynesia (IATA airport code)
 Temascaltepec, Nahuatl language (ISO 639 code)
 Noordzee Helikopters Vlaanderen, a Belgian helicopter operator
 Noise, vibration, and harshness